OTS 44 is a free-floating planetary-mass object or brown dwarf located at  in the constellation Chamaeleon near the reflection nebula IC 2631. It is among the lowest-mass free-floating substellar objects, with approximately 11.5 times the mass of Jupiter, or approximately 1.1% that of the Sun.
Its radius is not very well known and is estimated to be 23–57% that of the Sun.

OTS 44 was discovered in 1998 by Oasa, Tamura, and Sugitani as a member of the star-forming region Chamaeleon I. Based upon infrared observations with the Spitzer Space Telescope and the Herschel Space Observatory, OTS 44 emits an excess of infrared radiation for an object of its type, suggesting it has a circumstellar disk of dust and particles of rock and ice. This disk has a mass of at least 10 Earth masses.
Observations with the SINFONI spectrograph at the Very Large Telescope show that the disk
is accreting matter at the rate of approximately 10−11 of the mass of the Sun per year. It could eventually develop into a planetary system. Observations with ALMA detected the disk in millimeter wavelengths. The observations constrained the dust mass of the disk between 0.07 and 0.63 , but these mass estimates are limited by assumptions on poorly constrained parameters.

See also
 SCR 1845-6357, a binary system comprising a red dwarf and a brown dwarf
 Cha 110913-773444, an astronomical object that may be a free-floating planet surrounded by what appears to be a protoplanetary disk

References

External links
 Astronomers Discover Beginnings of 'Mini' Solar System (Spitzer Space Telescope)
 MPIA Science Release 2013-09 - Blurring the lines between stars and planets: Lonely planets offer clues to star formation

M-type brown dwarfs
Free-floating substellar objects
Chamaeleon (constellation)
Astronomical objects discovered in 1998